Lilla Sjötullsbron (Swedish: "Small Sea Customs Bridge") is a concrete pedestrian bridge in central Stockholm, Sweden.  Passing over Djurgårdsbrunnskanalen it connects Djurgården island to the mainland north of it.

Completed in 1965, the bridge was named after the building of the canal guard, called Lilla sjötullen ("Small sea Customs"), built in the 1820s.  The bridge is about 3.7 metres wide, 32 metres long of which some 20 metres passes over the canal.  It offers a horizontal clearance of 3.1 metres.

References

See also 
 List of bridges in Stockholm
 Djurgårdsbron
 Djurgårdsbrunnsbron
 Djurgårdsbrunnsviken

Bridges in Stockholm
Bridges completed in 1965
Pedestrian bridges in Sweden